Tekla Juniewicz (born Tekla Dadak; 10 June 1906 – 19 August 2022) was a Polish supercentenarian who, until her death at the age of 116 years and 70 days, was the second oldest living person in the world (after Lucile Randon) for four months, upon the death of Kane Tanaka. She is the oldest Polish person in history.

Biography

Personal life 
Tekla Juniewicz (née Tekla Dadak) was born on 10 June 1906 in Krupsko, then in Austria-Hungary, now in Ukraine and was baptised in the local Greek Catholic church on the same day. Her father, Jan Dadak, worked for count Lanckoroński and her mother, Katarzyna, was a housewife who died during World War I. Juniewicz married her husband, Jan Juniewicz, in 1927, with whom she had two children. They moved to Boryslav. In 1945, during repatriation, she left the territory along with her husband and daughters and settled in Gliwice.

Death 
Juniewicz died on 19 August 2022, due to a stroke and heart complications. Her funeral was held on 23 August 2022, four days after her death. She was buried in Gliwice, the city in which she had lived for most of her life. The Prime Minister of Poland, Mateusz Morawiecki, attended the funeral.

Family 
Juniewicz had two daughters, five grandchildren, four great-grandchildren and four great-great-grandchildren. Juniewicz's fourth great-great-granddaughter, Iga Tekla, was born on 10 June 2021, her 115th birthday. Her grandchildren looked after her until her death.

See also 
 List of the verified oldest people

References 

1906 births
2022 deaths
People from Gliwice
People from the Kingdom of Galicia and Lodomeria
Polish supercentenarians
Women supercentenarians